Nassau (also  ,) is a town located in the German state of Rhineland-Palatinate. It lies in the valley of the river Lahn between the towns of Bad Ems and Limburg an der Lahn. Nassau was the seat of the former Verbandsgemeinde Nassau, and is part of the Nassau Nature Park. The town is on the German-Dutch holiday road, the Orange Route. As of 2017, it had a population of 4,521.

Nassau gave its name to the prominent royal House of Nassau and directly or indirectly to numerous geographical entities, including a sovereign state, the Duchy of Nassau; the Prussian province of Hesse-Nassau; the historical and geographical region Nassau; Nassau, the capital of the Bahamas; and Nassau County, on Long Island in New York State. Historically, the entire Long Island was also called Nassau, though the name came to be limited to just that one section.

History

The earliest known surviving mention of Nassau refers to the Villa Nassova estate of the Bishopric of Worms in a 915 deed. In 1348 the Emperor Charles IV granted Nassau town-privileges rights together with nearby Dausenau and Scheuern. Count Dudo-Heinrich of Laurenburg had the Nassau Castle built about 1100 and his descendants began to call themselves the Counts of Nassau. 

Count Adolf of Nassau served as the elected King of the Romans from 1292 until his death on 2 July 1298. The Counts of Nassau married into the line of the neighbouring Counts of Arnstein (Obernhof/Attenhausen), founders of the monastery at Arnstein. After the dissolution of the Holy Roman Empire in 1806, the town became part of the Duchy of Nassau.

Nassau suffered heavily from bombings by American B-26 Marauders during World War II, all three hospitals and almost all of the inner city were completely destroyed.

Despite the ancient and eventful history of this town, it had a population of fewer than 5,000 inhabitants .

The town of Nassau became the namesake of the Duchy of Nassau, the royal House of Nassau and its branch named the House of Orange-Nassau, and the Prussian province of Hesse-Nassau. William III of England obtained a title Nassau. The Grand Duke of Luxembourg still uses Nassau as a title and  it is also part of the Dutch royal family (called Orange-Nassau).  Its name has also spawned a multitude of other namings in the Americas, such as Nassau, the capital city of the Bahamas, and Nassau County, New York, in the United States. The name also occurs in the titles of ships, buildings, and even a type of bet used in golf.

Main sights
Located in Nassau, south of the river Lahn, is the Nassau Castle. It is the eponymous ancestral seat of the counts of Nassau and thus the joint ancestral castle of the Grand Dukes of Luxembourg and Dutch royal house of Nassau.

The town is also home to the Steinische Hof, the seat of the Reichsfreiherren (Barons) vom und zum Stein, and birthplace of the Prussian reformer and Minister Heinrich Friedrich Karl, Reichsfreiherr vom und zum Stein.

People
The Imperial Baron Heinrich Friedrich Karl vom und zum Stein, Prussian statesman and reformer, was born in Nassau on October 25, 1757. Here he wrote his famous Nassauer Memorandum of 1807. Stein descended from an ancient aristocratic dynasty, who had been residents of Nassau since the 12th century. The family estate lies in the centre of the town, called the Steinische Hof, which today is still in the possession of the descendants of the reformer, the Counts von Kanitz. He died in Cappenberg, district of Selm in the year 1831.

Sons and daughters of the city 
 Johann Philipp Bethmann (1715-1793), banker, founder of the banking firm Bethmann brothers in Frankfurt
 Johann Jakob Bethmann (1717-1792), merchant and shipowner, imperial consul in Bordeaux
 Simon Moritz Bethmann, (1721-1782), banker and patron, co-founder of the Bethmann brothers' bank in Frankfurt
 Arnold Rönnebeck (1885-1947), German-American sculptor, lithograph and museum director of the Denver Art Museum
 Wolfgang Franz (born 1944), economist, 1997-2013 President of the ZEW

Personalities who are associated with Nassau
 Constantin Fahlberg (Tambov 1850 – Nassau 1910), chemist and science researcher
 Alexander von Falkenhausen (Gut Blumenthal 1878 – Nassau 1966), general; military advisor to Chiang Kai-shek; head of the military government of Belgium during  German occupation 1940-1944.

References

External links
Nassau Homepage
 
Nassau on Google Earth

Towns in Rhineland-Palatinate
Rhein-Lahn-Kreis